A wedding planner is a professional who assists with the design, planning and management of a client's wedding. Weddings are significant events in people's lives and as such, couples are often willing to spend considerable amount of money to ensure that their weddings are well-organized. Wedding planners are often used by couples who work long hours and have little spare time available for sourcing and managing wedding venues and wedding suppliers.

Professional wedding planners are based worldwide but the industry is the largest in the USA, India, western Europe and China. Various wedding planning courses are available to those who wish to pursue the career. Planners generally charge either a percentage of the total wedding cost, or a flat fee.

Planners are also popular with couples planning a destination wedding, where the documentation and paperwork can be complicated. Any country where a wedding is held requires different procedures depending on the nationality of each the bride and the groom. For instance, US citizens marrying in Italy require a Nulla Osta (affidavit sworn in front of the US consulate in Italy), plus an Atto Notorio (sworn in front of the Italian consulate in the US or at a court in Italy), and legalization of the above. Some countries instead have agreements and the couple can get their No Impediment forms from their local registrar and have it translated by the consulate in the country of the wedding. A local wedding planner can take care of the different procedures.

Services

The services of a wedding planner may include:
 Interview the couple and parents to identify their needs.
 Preparation of the budget
 Design and style of the event
 Scouting locations
 Photoshoots
 Planning a detailed checklist (about a year in advance for a few days after the wedding)
 Preparation of the list of participants
 Identification of venues for events (hotels, party house, ceremony, church, temples etc.)
 Identification and contracting of wedding professionals and service providers (suppliers, photographers, videographers, beauticians, florists, sweets, buffet, drinks, etc.) and contract preparation and execution.
 Acquisition of custom decorations, such as a travel map
 Coordination of deliveries / services on the wedding day.
 Have a back-up plan in the event of a disaster.
 Manages programming, often with software.
 Help and prepare legal documentation and translations - especially for destination weddings
 Event layout indicating the location of the dance floor, buffet points, tables, chairs, lounges, etc.
 Event briefing for all suppliers (Contact the wedding week vendors for details and schedules)
 Coordinating wedding day, conference and pre-event assembly follow-up

In popular culture 
The 2001 comedy  The Wedding Planner with Jennifer Lopez and Matthew McConaughey is about the busy life of a wedding planner who falls in love with one of her clients. Also, many TV shows that have branched from wedding planning, such as TLC's Say Yes to the Dress. This is a reality show that follows brides as they shop at the prestigious Kleinfeld's for their perfect wedding dress. Another show is 'My Fair Wedding' with celebrity party planner David Tutera.

More recently, Bollywood film Band Baaja Baaraat is about marriage planners falling in love. Ranveer Singh made his debut with this film and won Best Debutant at several awards. The film had a successful run at the theaters.

The 2011 Hong Kong television drama Only You tells the stories of a fictional wedding services agency and their clients.

See also
 Event planning
 Marriage proposal planner

References

Pre-wedding
Planner